Richard Luke Concanen, O.P. (December 27, 1747 – June 19, 1810), was an Irish prelate of the Roman Catholic Church, who served as the first bishop of the Diocese of New York (1808–1810).

Life
Richard Concanen was born in Kilbegnet, County Galway, then in the Kingdom of Ireland, a descendant of the Uí Díarmata dynasty. He completed his theological studies in Italy at age 17. (note, V.F. O'Daniel says he likely studied at the Dominican College in Louvain before joining the order at the age of eighteen or nineteen, and taking the name of "Luke"). He was ordained a Dominican priest on December 22, 1770, at the Lateran Basilica. He then served as a professor (and later prior) at the Dominican convent of St. Clement's in Rome, librarian of Santa Maria sopra Minerva, and secretary of the Dominican province of Great Britain, while also serving as the agent of the Irish bishops. Concanen was fluent in Italian, and also knew Irish, English, Latin, French, and German. 

Pope Pius VI nominated Concanen as Bishop of Kilfenora and Apostolic Administrator of Kilmacduagh in 1798, but the latter declined due to his delicate health. 

Concanen was a friend of Baltimore Archbishop John Carroll. Deeply interested in the missions of the United States, Concanen was instrumental in procuring permission for Father Edward Fenwick OP to leave England to set up a Dominican province in America. He made large contributions to St. Rose Priory in Kentucky, and bequeathed the Priory his library.

On April 8, 1808, Concanen was appointed the first bishop of the newly erected Diocese of New York by Pope Pius VII. He received his episcopal consecration on the following April 24 from Cardinal Michele di Pietro, with Archbishops Tommaso Arezzo and Benedetto Sinibaldi serving as co-consecrators. However, Concanen never stepped on American soil; due to the embargoes enacted during the Napoleonic Wars, he was unable to sail from the Port of Naples and was even detained as a British subject by the French forces in possession of the city. He administered his diocese by correspondence with the missionary priests working in New York City.

Concanen later died in Naples, aged 62, where his body rests in the Church of San Domenico Maggiore.

References

1747 births
1810 deaths
Christian clergy from County Galway
American Dominicans
Irish Dominicans
18th-century Irish Roman Catholic priests
Irish expatriates in Italy
Dominican bishops
19th-century Roman Catholic bishops in the United States
Roman Catholic bishops of New York
Burials at the Basilica of San Domenico, Naples
Irish expatriate Catholic bishops